James Harold Young  (7 July 1925 – 18 June 2020) was a New Zealand sailor, boat designer and builder.

Early life and family
Born in Wellington on 7 July 1925, Young was the son of Cyril Ernest Young and Daisy Winifred Young (née Babington) of Lower Hutt. He moved to Auckland when he was 10 years old, and began a boatbuilding apprenticeship in 1940, working on general boat maintenance and the construction of wooden naval vessels until 1945. He served in Japan as part of J-Force in 1946.

Boat design and building
After returning from Japan, Young began designing and building yachts, first at a shed in Little Shoal Bay, Birkenhead, and then in Takapuna. In 1949, he won the Sanders Cup in a 14-foot X class yacht that he designed, built and skippered himself. Over the next seven decades, he designed and built numerous innovative boats, including keelboats and catamarans that were successful in racing both in New Zealand and internationally. He is best known for designing the Young88 and Rocket31 (both keelboats), and the Vindex range of wooden cruising boats.

Young employed Bruce Farr, who would go on to become New Zealand's leading boat designer, as a boatbuilder designer when the latter was a teenager.

In the 2012 New Year Honours, Young was appointed an Officer of the New Zealand Order of Merit, for services to boat building.

Death
Young died on 18 June 2020. A memorial service was held at the Royal New Zealand Yacht Squadron in Auckland.

References

1925 births
2020 deaths
New Zealand boat builders
New Zealand yacht designers
Officers of the New Zealand Order of Merit
People from Wellington City